Tirana East Gate (TEG) is a shopping mall based in Tirana, Albania.

The mall was inaugurated on 26 November 2011 by former Prime Minister of Albania, Sali Berisha and other representatives of the Albanian government. It accommodates 180 shops, 10 bars, cafes and 5 restaurants. Approximately 4,200 parking spaces are available. Around 2,000 people are employed here.

List of prominent stores includes LTB, FLO, ELLE, PENTI, Interspar, Zara, Massimo Dutti, Pull and Bear, Bershka, Timberland, Calzedonia, S.Oliver, LC Waikiki, Reebok, Adidas, Rossmann, Mango, Geox, Swarovski, Springfield, Swatch, Spar, and more. 

Kentucky Fried Chicken (KFC), Pizza Hut, Burger King and Coffeeshop Company are also located in the Mall. TEG also features some local brands of fast food restaurants like Kolonat.

The Mall also features a Cineplexx multiplex cinema.

Four bus lines connect the city with the Tirana East Gate.

See also  
 Economy of Albania
 List of shopping malls in Albania

References

 
Shopping malls in Tirana
Shopping malls established in 2011
2011 establishments in Albania